Prangos eriantha is a species of flowering plant in the family Apiaceae, native to Iran. It was first described by Augustin de Candolle in 1830 as Cachrys eriantha.

References

Apioideae
Flora of Iran
Plants described in 1830